, real name  (born May 8, 1959 in Chiba Prefecture), is a former Japanese singer and composer.

Early life and career
As early as grade school she was already composing her own music.

She debuted in 1982 with the single  and the album . Her 1984 single  was the 50th best-selling single of the year in Japan, with 237,000 copies sold. She became instantly popular.

Ro Ro Ro Russian Roulette won the award for Best Song at the 8th Anime Grand Prix in 1986.

The 1992 live tour was the last public performance from her and her singing career is considered to have ended around this time.

Later career
Even after ceasing to continue as a singer, Nakahara has still worked as a composer for groups and singers like Checkicco and Vivian Hsu. A tribute band to her called Lotos was formed in 2010 and was still active as of 2019.

Discography

Albums

Greatest hits albums

Singles

References

External links 
 

Living people
Musicians from Chiba Prefecture
Anime singers
1959 births
20th-century Japanese women singers
20th-century Japanese singers